Zadko Observatory is an astronomical observatory (obs. code: D20) located within the Wallingup Plain in the Gingin shire, Western Australia. It is owned and operated by the University of Western Australia.

History 

The Zadko Observatory was created in 2008 to host the Zadko Telescope, a 1.0m instrument donated to the University of Western Australia by James Zadko, CEO of Claire Energy. It was then expanded to fit several other instruments in 2011. The Observatory is located close to the Australian Interferometer Gravitational Observatory. The original construction cost AUD 1 million.

Observations are performed robotically every night, and have led to various important results, such as the observation of the first detected counterpart of a gravitational wave source, GW170817.

Instruments 

The observatory operates one robotic 1.0-metre Cassegrain telescope for scientific studies. In addition, the observatory hosts three instruments devoted to student researches and several instruments operated by private companies.

See also 
 List of astronomical observatories

References

External links 
 Zadko Observatory official website

Astronomical observatories in Western Australia